Sir Martyn Poliakoff  (born 16 December 1947) is a British chemist, working on gaining insights into fundamental chemistry, and on developing environmentally acceptable processes and materials. The core themes of his work are supercritical fluids, infrared spectroscopy and lasers. He is a research professor in chemistry at the University of Nottingham. His group comprises several members of staff, postdoctoral research fellows, postgraduate students and overseas visitors.  As well as carrying out research at the University of Nottingham, he is a lecturer, teaching a number of modules including green chemistry.

Poliakoff became popularly known in the late 2000s and early 2010s as the main presenter for the YouTube channel Periodic Videos.

Early life
Poliakoff was born to a British-Jewish mother, Ina (née Montagu), and Russian-Jewish father, Alexander Poliakoff. He has a younger brother, the screenwriter and director Stephen Poliakoff. His paternal grandfather, Joseph Poliakoff, was a prolific inventor of electrical devices who experienced the communist revolution in Russia first-hand, and emigrated to the United Kingdom in 1924.

Education
Poliakoff was educated at Westminster School followed by King's College, Cambridge, graduating with a bachelor's degree in 1969, and a PhD in 1973, for research supervised by J.J. Turner.  While an undergraduate at Cambridge, Poliakoff met and became close friends with Tony Judt, who later became a historian and writer.

Career and research
In 1972, Poliakoff moved to Newcastle University and in 1979 was appointed a lecturer at the University of Nottingham, where he was subsequently promoted to professor in 1991. His research has been funded by the EPSRC.

Poliakoff is a global leader in the field of green chemistry with a specific interest in the applications of supercritical fluids. These highly compressed gases possess properties of gases and liquids that permit interesting chemical reactions without the need for organic solvents, which endanger both health and the environment. His contributions have enabled the development of supercritical carbon dioxide and water solvent systems to replace traditional organic solvents at the industrial scale. As foreign secretary and vice-president of the Royal Society from 2011 to 2016, he worked to represent and further the impact of UK science around the world.

Popular science
Poliakoff is the narrator in most of a series of over 600 short videos called The Periodic Table of Videos, a popular science project produced by Brady Haran, originally intended to familiarise the public with all 118 elements of the periodic table.  The project has since expanded to cover molecules; there are also several special videos about other chemical topics. He hit the news for calculating that the FIFA World Cup Trophy could not have been made from solid gold as it would be too heavy to raise aloft. Poliakoff showed some videos at IUPAC's elements inauguration in the Central Club of Scientists of the Russian Academy of Sciences in Moscow.

Honours and awards
Poliakoff was awarded the Meldola Medal and Prize from the Royal Society of Chemistry in 1976. He was elected Fellow of the Royal Society (FRS) in 2002, Fellow of the Royal Society of Chemistry (FRSC) also in 2002, and Fellow of the Institution of Chemical Engineers (FIChemE) in 2004. He served on the IChemE Council between 2009 and 2013. Poliakoff was appointed Commander of the Order of the British Empire (CBE) in the 2008 New Year Honours and is a member of the Advisory Council for the Campaign for Science and Engineering since 2008. In 2008, he was elected an Honorary Member of the Chemical Society of Ethiopia and a Foreign Member of the Russian Academy of Sciences in 2011. He took up the positions of Foreign Secretary and Vice-president of the Royal Society in November 2011, positions which are held for a fixed five-year period. In 2011, he won the Nyholm Prize for Education.

Poliakoff also received an Honorary Doctorate from Heriot-Watt University in 2011.

In 2012, Poliakoff was elected a Fellow of the Academia Europaea and in 2013, an Associate Fellow of TWAS, the World Academy of Science. He was elected an Associate Fellow of the Ethiopian Academy of Sciences in 2014. Poliakoff was knighted in the 2015 New Year Honours for services to the chemical sciences. Poliakoff was awarded the Lord Lewis Prize in 2016 for his work concerning the applications of supercritical fluids, and for his work in the development of science policy within the EU and globally. In 2017 Poliakoff was elected Fellow of the Royal Academy of Engineering (FREng). In 2019, he was awarded the Royal Society of London Michael Faraday Prize for science communication for his work on the Periodic Videos. He was also awarded the 2019 Longstaff Prize for his "outstanding contributions to green chemistry and for participating centrally in the creation of the Periodic Table Videos".

A tram in Nottingham's tram network was named after him in 2021.

Personal life
Poliakoff has a daughter, Ellen Poliakoff, a psychology lecturer at the University of Manchester; and a son, Simon Poliakoff, a physics teacher at The Priory School Hitchin.  Martyn Poliakoff produced a web eulogy of close friend Tony Judt in 2010.

On Poliakoff's birthday in 2011, his students brought him periodic table cupcakes. Periodic table cupcakes have been used for science and chemistry education since they were first created by Ida Freund.

References

1947 births
Living people
British chemists
Fellows of the Royal Society
Commanders of the Order of the British Empire
People educated at Westminster School, London
Academics of the University of Nottingham
English Jews
British people of Russian-Jewish descent
Alumni of King's College, Cambridge
Knights Bachelor
Foreign Members of the Russian Academy of Sciences
Fellows of the Royal Society of Chemistry
Martyn
Online edutainment
Fellows of the Ethiopian Academy of Sciences